The 2011 Challenge Casino Lac Leamy was held from October 21 to 23 at the Buckingham Curling Club in Buckingham, Quebec as part of the 2011–12 World Curling Tour. This is the first time a women's event was held. The purses for the men's and women's were CAD$36,500 and CAD$11,000, respectively.

Men

Playoffs

Women

Playoffs

References

External links

Challenge Casino Lac Leamy
Challenge Casino Lac Leamy
Challenge Casino Lac Leamy
Curling competitions in Quebec